Replenish may refer to:

 Replenish (album), a 1995 album by English alternative-rock band Reef
Repent Replenish Repeat, an album by Dan le Sac Vs Scroobius Pip, released in 2013
 Samsung Replenish, an Android 2.3 smartphone

See also 
 Replenishment (disambiguation)